Bartolomé Esono Asumu (born 25 May 1963) is an Equatoguinean middle-distance runner. He competed in the men's 800 metres at the 1984 Summer Olympics.

References

External links
 

1963 births
Living people
Athletes (track and field) at the 1984 Summer Olympics
Equatoguinean male middle-distance runners
Olympic athletes of Equatorial Guinea
Place of birth missing (living people)